The Göktürks founded two major khanates known as the Turkic Khaganate:

 First Turkic Khaganate, which then fractured into
 Western Turkic Khaganate
 Eastern Turkic Khaganate
 Second Turkic Khaganate

See also
 Turkic khanate
 List of Turkic dynasties and countries